Olimpin  is a village in the administrative district of Gmina Nowa Wieś Wielka, within Bydgoszcz County, Kuyavian-Pomeranian Voivodeship, in north-central Poland.

References

Olimpin